Gregory Sporleder (born April 14, 1964) is an American actor and filmmaker, notable for playing military men in films such as The Rock, Black Hawk Down and Renaissance Man, as well as Calvin Norris in the HBO series True Blood.

Early life
Sporleder graduated from University City High School in St. Louis, Missouri and was voted the top dancer in his class.

Career
Sporleder got his first major role in the 1989 romance Say Anything... alongside John Cusack. In 1994, he appeared as "Billy" in the music video for Sheryl Crow's song "All I Wanna Do". He had supporting roles in films such as A League of Their Own, True Romance, 1998's quirky Uncorked and episodes of Murphy Brown, NYPD Blue and Smallville.

Sporleder also appeared in Being John Malkovich, Black Hawk Down, S.W.A.T., The Big Bounce, Hotel for Dogs, Andersonville and 17 Again. Sporleder landed the role of Calvin Norris in True Blood, the father of Crystal Norris. In 2014, he appeared on Criminal Minds as Sam Caplan.

In 2016, Sporleder participated in a documentary about the Missouri painter George Caleb Bingham, playing Bingham as an adult.

Filmography

Film

Television

References

External links 

1964 births
Living people
Male actors from St. Louis
American male film actors
American male television actors